A revivalist is a person who holds, promotes, or presides over religious revivals. A secondary definition for revivalist is a person who revives customs, institutions, or ideas. The definition has become more robust in recent decades, and has been revised and adapted by American Charismatic and Pentecostal Christians to be someone who “recognizes that God’s manifest presence transforms lives and cultures.”  A revivalist can also include someone that either presides over, or actively pursues, a religious re-awakening or restoration to spiritual ideas, orthodoxy, religious or personal experiences, and/or communal pursuit of divine occurrences.

Revivals are defined as “a period of heightened spiritual activity in a section of the church, brought about by a renewing and empowering work of the Holy Spirit, bringing a new sense of the presence of God, especially in his holiness, resulting in a deeper awareness of sin in the lives of believers, followed by new joy as sin is confessed and forgiven.”  Common jargon for these meetings or series of meetings can include, “having a revival meeting” or “to hold a revival.”  The meetings and gatherings can last for days, several weeks, or for many years on rare occasions.

History
Revivalists have been prominent in all major evolutions of the Christian church.  In the First Great Awakening, Jonathan Edwards was credited with being the initial catalyst for this movement that would greatly impact American culture from 1734 to 1750.  George Whitefield also did much to see The Great Awakening's furtherance and influence on the American public.

The Second Great Awakening began at the end of the 18th century, and continued until the mid-nineteenth century.   It was characterized by several prominent revivalists with differing denominational backgrounds and message focuses.  Charles Finney is often cited as the most prominent preacher of the Second Great Awakening.  He was known for both genders being present in his meetings, his extemporaneous preaching style, the introduction of the “nervous seat” (where those considering salvation could contemplate), and the “altar call” (invitation at the end of a church service for an attendee to come forward for prayer).  Charles Finney also introduced the concept that revivals were not necessarily sovereign acts of God, but could be initiated by believers following Biblical precedents and prescriptions.  Pastor Finney exclaimed, "A revival is not a miracle, not dependent on a miracle, in any sense.  It is purely philosophical result of the right use of the constituted means."  
Lyman Beecher, another prominent Second Great Awakening preacher, was largely known for encouraging and expanding temperance.

Revival from 1900-1950s
At the beginning of the 20th century, several “revivals” began across the United States, Europe, and eventually effected many parts of the world.  In the early 1900s, Charles Parham was leading a school called Bethel in Topeka, Kansas.  One of his students had an experience with glossolalia. He and his students became prominent proponents of the experience being indicative of The Baptism of the Holy Spirit. William Seymour, a student of Charles Parham, was instrumental in the Azusa Street Revival in Los Angeles, California.  The revival meetings held at Azusa Street were reported to include remarkable miracles, healings, and divine experiences.

The Azusa Street revival spread overseas, and particularly impacted Wales through Evan Roberts.  The outpouring was termed The Welsh Revival and lasted from 1904 through 1905.
At a similar time-frame, John G. Lake was reported to have held several healing crusades in Africa, and began a healing ministry in Spokane, Washington. Throughout the international community, several other revivals were reported to have occurred during the first decade of the 20th century.

In the mid-20th century, several other revivalists became prominent in American culture.  William Branham was the spear-head for several healing ministers emerging during the 1930s, 40s, and early 50s.  Branham supported faith healing, and had testified to seeing visions before praying for the healing of his meeting attendees.  Jack Coe was another healing evangelist reported to have numerous healings during his meetings, and a passionate preaching style.  Oral Roberts and Billy Graham emerged during the late 1940s, and spread the revival influence and meetings further.  Oral Roberts was considered a healing minister, whereas Billy Graham's "crusades" were characterized by large crowds and an emphasis on salvation.

Contemporary revivalists
Several prominent “revivalist” organizations and ministries have gained prominence in the last several decades.  Reinhard Bonnke was a German evangelist who had a ministry impacting millions of African citizens at "crusades". He is recognized for his impassioned messages, his focus on salvation through Christ, and the redeeming and healing blood of Jesus Christ.

Heidi Baker and Rolland Baker have also gained international recognition for an exponentially expanding network of churches throughout the world.  Their organization, Iris Ministries, has upwards of 10,000 connected churches partnered for revival.  Iris Ministries is located in Mozambique, Africa.

John and Carol Arnott are ministers from Toronto, Canada.  They, along with Randy Clark, were the foremost ministers in a charismatic move of God referred to as the Toronto Blessing.  The Toronto blessing was divisive in the fact that holy laughter, being intoxicated in the Holy Spirit, and other charismatic manifestations were highly visible.  The Toronto Blessing was also reported to have a primary focus on emotional and spiritual healing of father “wounds” or issues.

Bill Johnson is also a figurehead in the most recent wave of revival-focused activity within Christendom.  Bill Johnson is the senior pastor of Bethel Church in Redding, California.  Pastor Johnson is an author, and his church has been highly influential in creating a theology that recognizes “God is good” and “God’s healing is for today.”

Notable revivalists

 AB Simpson
 David Brainerd
 William Branham
 John Bunyan
 Alexander Dowie
 Jonathan Edwards
 Kathryn Kuhlman
 John Knox
 John G. Lake
 Aimee Semple McPherson
 George Müller
 Watchman Nee
 Charles Parham
 William J. Seymour
 Sadhu Sundar Sing
 Charles Spurgeon
 A.W. Tozer
 John Wesley
 Smith Wigglesworth
 George Whitefield

Revivalist organizations

Iris Ministries
Global Awakening
Global Legacy
Revival Alliance
Revival Fires International
Toronto Airport Christian Fellowship
Saturate Global

See also
 Christian revival

References

External links 
 Revival-Centric Ministries
 Iris Ministries
 Toronto Airport Christian Fellowship
 Bill Johnson Ministries
 Revival Teaching Series
 Reinhard Bonnke

Christian terminology